Osborne railway station is located on the Outer Harbor line. Situated in the north-western Adelaide suburb of Osborne, it is 19.6 kilometres from Adelaide station.

History 

This station was opened on 30 November 1908.

Just south of the station, the line from Adelaide becomes single track for the remainder of the journey to Outer Harbor. It once had two platforms but one closed in the 1980s when the balloon loop north was removed. The unused track was gradually removed, with the last remnants at the level crossing next to the station pulled up in July 2019. Just south of the station, the ICI Osborne railway line branched off to the ICI Osborne works (later owned by Penrice Soda Products). This had industrial passenger service until 1980 and has since been dismantled. Some peak hour services from Adelaide terminate at Osborne.

Services by platform

Transport links

|}

|}

References

External links

Railway stations in Adelaide
Railway stations in Australia opened in 1908
Lefevre Peninsula